Chunauti is an Indian television series that aired on DD National from 1987 to 1988.

Plot
Chunauti was a window into the psyche of college life in India. The serial profiled an idealist college principal Mr. Shastri and his travails with the problems that plague students including admissions, donations, ragging, miserable hostel conditions, drug addiction, irresponsible teachers, mass copying, and other malpractices. Character graphs and a well-crafted emotional drama covering every aspect of college life in detail made Chunauti a big hit.
 
Chunauti highlighted the higher education system and generated tremendous response from thinkers, planners and common masses. In the serial, principal Shastri faces adversity. In the end, however, with the assistance of many of his students and colleagues he emerges victorious.

Cast

 Rajeev Verma 
 Ajit Vachhani
 Mohan Bhandari
 Bharat Kapoor as Kothari
 Arif Zakaria as Ramakant Sharma
 Sunil Puri
 Channa Ruparel as Kamini
 Suchitra Krishnamoorthi as Vandana
 Raju Shrestha
 Rita Bhaduri
 Archana Joglekar
 Ali Asgar as Yogi
 Devadatt Paranjape

Production
Producer: Rakesh Chowdhary
Director: Sanjiv Bhattacharya
Story/teleplay: Ashok Patole
Dialogue: Mir Muneer
Camera: Bharat Nerkar
Art director: C. S. Bhatti

References

External links
 
Chunauti Title Song Video on YouTube.com

DD National original programming
Indian television series
1987 Indian television series debuts
1980s Indian television series
1988 Indian television series endings